German International School may refer to:
 German International School Boston
 German International School of Cairo
 German International School Chennai
 German International School Dubai
 German International School Jakarta
 German International School Jeddah
 German International School Riyadh
 German International School of Silicon Valley
 German International School of The Hague
 German School Seoul International

See also
 German Embassy School (disambiguation)
 German School (disambiguation)